Down the Gasoline Trail is a 1935 cartoon sponsored film created to promote Chevrolet automobiles. It is about an animated drop of gasoline, who travels through the car, eventually entering the engine and being vapourised. It is in the public domain.

See also
A Coach for Cinderella
Chevrolet
Jam Handy
Advertising
Sponsored film

External links
 Down the Gasoline Trail for free download

1935 animated films
1935 films
Jam Handy Organization films
Promotional films
Sponsored films
Chevrolet